Tranøy or Tranøya is a village and ancient trade centre in the municipality of Hamarøy in Nordland county, Norway. The Tranøy Lighthouse is located west of the village on a small islet connected to the mainland by a pedestrian bridge.

The novelist Knut Hamsun worked as a shop assistant at Tranøy in his younger days.

References

Hamarøy
Villages in Nordland
Populated places of Arctic Norway